Susan Brice is a Canadian politician, who represented the electoral district of Saanich South in the Legislative Assembly of British Columbia from 2001 to 2005. She sat as a member of the BC Liberal Party.  Currently, she is a member of Saanich municipal Council, first elected in 2005.

An elementary school teacher, Susan Brice served as an elected trustee to the Victoria School Board from 1975 to 1980, including as chair of the board from 1978 to 1979. She was elected councillor to the Municipality of Oak Bay in 1980 and as Mayor in 1985. She served  as a director on the Capital Regional District board from 1985 to 1990, and chaired the board from 1988 to 1989.

Ms. Brice also served on the board of the Better Business Bureau.

Electoral record

References

External links
 Profile at the Legislative Assembly of British Columbia

British Columbia Liberal Party MLAs
Women MLAs in British Columbia
Living people
21st-century Canadian politicians
21st-century Canadian women politicians
Women government ministers of Canada
Members of the Executive Council of British Columbia
Year of birth missing (living people)